Unguja North Region, Zanzibar North Region or North Zanzibar Region (Mkoa wa Unguja Kaskazini in Swahili) is one of the 31 regions of Tanzania. The region is comparable in size to the combined land area of the nation state of Andorra. and the administrative region is located entirely on the island of Zanzibar. Unguja North Region is bordered on three sides to the north by Indian Ocean, southeast by Unguja South Region and southwest by Mjini Magharibi Region. The regional capital is the town of Mkokotoni. According to the 2012 census, the region has a total population of 187, 455. Zanzibar North is divided into two districts, Kaskazini A and Kaskazini B.

Administrative divisions

Districts

Unguja North Region is divided into two districts, each administered by a council:

Constituencies
 election Zanzibar North Region had eight constituencies:

References

 
Regions of Tanzania
Geography of Zanzibar